Tres Hermanas Falls (Spanish for Three Sisters) is reportedly the third tallest waterfall in the world, with a height of . It is located inside Otishi National Park, near the northern fork of the Cutivireni River, in the Peruvian region of Junín.

Tres Hermanas is a tiered waterfall, with three drops or sections and is surrounded by montane forest.

See also
List of waterfalls by height

References 

Waterfalls of Peru
Waterfalls of South America
Landforms of Junín Region